Angelique Francis is a Canadian blues singer from Ottawa, Ontario. She is most noted as the winner of the Juno Award for Blues Album of the Year at the Juno Awards of 2023, for her album Long River.

A graduate of the music performance program at Carleton University, she released her debut album Kissed by the Blues in 2018.

In addition to her Juno Award, she was also a Canadian Folk Music Award nominee for Contemporary Singer of the Year at the 18th Canadian Folk Music Awards.

References

21st-century Black Canadian women singers
Canadian blues singers
Musicians from Ottawa
Juno Award for Blues Album of the Year winners
Living people